Married to Rock is an American reality documentary television series on E! that debuted November 7, 2010.

Synopsis
The series focuses on the lives of the spouses of four rock musicians and also attempts to debunk common myths about the lifestyles of rock artists and their families.

Cast
 AJ Celi — girlfriend of Billy Duffy (guitarist for The Cult)
 Etty Farrell — wife of Perry Farrell (singer for Jane's Addiction)
 Josie Stevens — wife of Steve Stevens (guitarist for Billy Idol and soloist)
 Susan Holmes McKagan — wife of Duff McKagan (bassist for Velvet Revolver and Guns N' Roses)

Episodes

References

2010s American reality television series
2010 American television series debuts
2010 American television series endings
English-language television shows
E! original programming
Television series by Bunim/Murray Productions